is a railway station in the city of Kasugai, Aichi Prefecture, Japan, operated by Central Japan Railway Company (JR Tōkai).

Lines
Jinryō Station is served by the Chūō Main Line, and is located 376.1 kilometers from the starting point of the line at Tokyo Station and 20.8 kilometers from Nagoya Station.

Station layout
The station has one side platform and one island platforms connected by a footbridge, with an elevated station building. The station building has automated ticket machines, TOICA automated turnstiles and a staffed ticket office.

Platforms

Adjacent stations

|-
!colspan=5|JR Central

Station history
Along with the division and privatization of JNR on April 1, 1987, the station came under the control and operation of the Central Japan Railway Company. A new station building was completed in March 2008.

Passenger statistics
In fiscal 2017, the station was used by an average of 13,443 passengers daily (arriving passengers only).

Surrounding area
Chubu University
Moriyama High School

See also
 List of Railway Stations in Japan

References

External links

official home page

Railway stations in Japan opened in 1951
Railway stations in Aichi Prefecture
Chūō Main Line
Stations of Central Japan Railway Company
Kasugai, Aichi